Queen and Country may refer to:

Queen & Country, a comic book written by Greg Rucka and published by Oni Press.
Queen and Country (artwork), an artwork by Steve McQueen on the Iraq War.
Queen and Country (film), a 2014 British film
"Queen and Country", song of the 1974 album, War Child, by Jethro Tull
For Queen and Country, a 1988 British film starring Denzel Washington.

See also
For king and country (disambiguation)